LS3 may refer to:
 GM LS engine
 Legged Squad Support System, a military robot.
 The postcode area for the north-western part of Central Leeds
 Rolladen-Schneider LS3, a sailplane
 LS3/5A loudspeaker designed by the BBC